(24 pieces in free style), Op. 31, by Louis Vierne for organ or harmonium were written in two volumes during the years 1913 and 1914.

Presentation 
It is a collection of pieces for organ or harmonium, of medium level (intermediate), with an indication by the author of registrations and nuances. Vierne wrote in the Durand edition:
The parts of this collection are calculated in such a way that they can be executed during the normal duration of an Offertory. They are registered for a harmonium of 4.5 stops and for an organ with two keyboards and 18 to 20 stops pedal.

It goes without saying that registration is, here, a general indication of colour and that this registration can be modified according to the instruments available to artists.

Two immediately adjacent initials (G. R.) indicate that the grand organ is coupled to the récit, or swell; the initial G. indicates that this keyboard is separated from the swell. Same observation for the initials placed next to the name Ped. They indicate with which keyboard the pedal is coupled.

All pieces in this collection can be played entirely with the hands: when they are performed on a pedal organ, it will be good to divide in the hands the passages under which the pedal is used.

Details of the collections 

Book I (1913)
 Préambule   
 Cortège  
 Complainte   
 Épitaphe  
 Prélude    
 Canon  
 Méditation  
 Idylle mélancolique  
 Madrigal  
 Rêverie  
 Divertissement 
 Canzona

Book II (1914)
 Légende (to Maurice Blazy.)
 Scherzetto (to Alexandre Eugène Cellier)  
 Arabesque (to Émile Bourdon)  
 Choral (to Joseph Boulnois)   
 Lied (to Paul Fauchet)
 Marche funèbre (in memory of my friend Jules Bouval)  
 Berceuse on classical lyrics (to my daughter Colette)
 Pastorale (to Roger Boucher) 
 Carillon on the chime ringing of the Carillon in the chapel of the Château de Longpont (Aisne); (to my brother René Vierne)  
 Élégie (to Georges Kriéger.)  
 Épithalame (to André Renoux)  
 Postlude (to Émile Poillot)

References

External links 
 
 Vingt-quatre pièces en style libre, Op. 31, Bibliothèque nationale de France
 

Compositions by Louis Vierne
Compositions for organ
1914 compositions